Majialou (simplified Chinese: 马家楼; traditional Chinese: 馬家樓; pinyin: mǎ jiā lóu ) is a part of the city of Beijing to the southwest.
 
Majialou is a transportational node; the southeastern 4th Ring Road (Beijing) and the G45 Daqing–Guangzhou Expressway interconnect at Majialou.

Road transport in Beijing